The 2019 Scotties Tournament of Hearts, Canada's national women's curling championship, was held from February 16 to 24 at the Centre 200 in Sydney, Nova Scotia. The winning team represented Canada at the 2019 World Women's Curling Championship held from March 16 to 24 at the Silkeborg Sportscenter in Silkeborg, Denmark. The final game featured the largest comeback in Scotties Finals history (according to TSN statistics). Alberta's Chelsea Carey came back from a 5–1 deficit, winning the championship 8–6 thanks to 5 total steal points in the second half, and two dramatic misses by Ontario's Rachel Homan.

This year's tournament was notable for Nunavut winning their first Scotties round robin game ever, defeating Quebec's Gabrielle Lavoie 4–3 in Draw 1; and the highest scoring game ever at a Canadian women's curling championship in Draw 10 with Prince Edward Island's Suzanne Birt winning 13–12 in an extra end over New Brunswick's Andrea Crawford, a total match score of 25 points.

Team Canada's Jennifer Jones set a new record for the most Canadian national women's championship game wins as a skip when she skipped the 141st victory of her Scotties career over British Columbia's Sarah Wark in Draw 18 on February 22.

Teams
After winning the 2018 Scotties Tournament of Hearts, Team Jennifer Jones returned to represent Team Canada, but with a lineup change. Following Jill Officer's retirement after the 2017–18 season, the Jones rink added 2016 Scotties champion Jocelyn Peterman to the team as second. Officer would however join the team as their alternate. Many Scotties veterans such as Rachel Homan (Ontario), Chelsea Carey (Alberta), Krista McCarville (Northern Ontario), Kerry Galusha (Northwest Territories), Jill Brothers (Nova Scotia), and Suzanne Birt (Prince Edward Island) won their respective playdowns. Andrea Crawford returned to skip Team New Brunswick after taking some time off and moving to Germany. Tracy Fleury, who had previously represented Ontario and Northern Ontario, won the 2019 Manitoba Scotties Tournament of Hearts after defeating the heavily favored Kerri Einarson rink. Sarah Wark (British Columbia), Gabrielle Lavoie (Quebec) and Robyn Silvernagle (Saskatchewan) made their Scotties debuts.

Source:

CTRS ranking

Wildcard game
A wildcard play-in game was played on February 15. It was contested between the top two teams in the Canadian Team Ranking System standings who did not win their respective provincial championships: the Gimli Curling Club's Kerri Einarson rink from Gimli, Manitoba and the Lethbridge Curling Club's Casey Scheidegger rink from Lethbridge, Alberta. Team Wildcard entered the Scotties as the number 4 seed.

In advance of the 2018–19 season, Rachel Homan was guaranteed a spot in the wildcard game if her team did not win their provincial championship. The team was forced to decline their Team Canada berth in the 2018 Scotties due to qualifying for the Olympics. However, had Homan been eliminated from the provincials, her team would have qualified for the game without the guaranteed spot as they led the CTRS standings.

CTRS standings for wildcard game

Source:

Wildcard Game
Friday, February 15, 19:30

Round robin standings
Final Round Robin Standings

Round robin results
All draw times are listed in Atlantic Standard Time (UTC−04:00).

Draw 1
Saturday, February 16, 14:30

Draw 2
Saturday, February 16, 19:30

Draw 3
Sunday, February 17, 09:30

Draw 4
Sunday, February 17, 14:30

Draw 5
Sunday, February 17, 20:00

Draw 6
Monday, February 18, 09:30

Draw 7
Monday, February 18, 14:30

Draw 8
Monday, February 18, 19:30

Draw 9
Tuesday, February 19, 09:30

Draw 10
Tuesday, February 19, 14:30

^ This match set a record for the highest scoring game in Canadian national women's championship history.

Draw 11
Tuesday, February 19, 19:30

Draw 12
Wednesday, February 20, 09:30

Draw 13
Wednesday, February 20, 14:30

Draw 14
Wednesday, February 20, 19:30

Tiebreaker
Thursday, February 21, 09:30

Championship pool standings
The top four teams from each pool advanced to the Championship pool. All wins and losses earned in the round robin (including results against teams that failed to advance) were carried forward into the Championship Pool. Wins in tiebreaker games were not carried forward.

Final Championship pool standings

Championship pool results
All draw times are listed in Atlantic Standard Time (UTC−4:00).

Draw 15
Thursday, February 21, 14:30

Draw 16
Thursday, February 21, 19:30

Draw 17
Friday, February 22, 14:30

Draw 18
Friday, February 22, 19:30

^With Team Canada's victory, Jennifer Jones became the winningest skip at the Canadian national women's championship (141 victories), surpassing Colleen Jones

Playoffs

1 vs. 2
Saturday, February 23, 19:30

3 vs. 4
Saturday, February 23, 14:30

Semifinal
Sunday, February 24, 12:00

Final
Sunday, February 24, 18:00

Statistics

Top 5 player percentages
Final Round Robin Percentages; minimum 6 games

Awards
The awards and all-star teams were as follows:
All-Star Teams

First Team
Skip:  Rachel Homan, Ontario
Third:  Emma Miskew, Ontario
Second:  Jen Gates, Northern Ontario
Lead:  Dawn McEwen, Team Canada

Second Team
Skip:  Krista McCarville, Northern Ontario
Third:  Kendra Lilly, Northern Ontario
Second:  Joanne Courtney, Ontario
Lead:  Sarah Potts, Northern Ontario

Marj Mitchell Sportsmanship Award
 Sarah Potts, Northern Ontario

Joan Mead Builder Award
 Leslie Ann Walsh, for her contributions to grow the sport of curling in her home province of Newfoundland and Labrador, and grow the sport of wheelchair curling.

Paul McLean Award
Andrew Klaver, photojournalist

Notes

References

External links

 
Scotties Tournament of Hearts
Curling in Nova Scotia
Scotties Tournament of Hearts
Scotties Tournament of Hearts
Sport in the Cape Breton Regional Municipality
Scotties Tournament of Hearts